The Adopted is a 2011 French drama film directed and co-written by Mélanie Laurent. It stars Marie Denarnaud, Denis Ménochet, Laurent and Clémentine Célarié. Denis Ménochet won a Lumières Award for Most Promising Actor for his performance in the film.

Cast 
 Marie Denarnaud as Marine 
 Denis Ménochet as Alex 
 Clémentine Célarié as Millie  
 Mélanie Laurent as Lisa  
 Audrey Lamy as Clémence 
 Théodore Maquet-Foucher as Léo   
 Morgan Perez as Philippe

References

External links 
 

2011 films
2011 drama films
2010s French-language films
French drama films
Films directed by Mélanie Laurent
StudioCanal films
2011 directorial debut films
Films shot in Lyon
2010s French films